Ivan Kozlov (born 6 May 1978) is a Ukrainian ski jumper. He competed in the normal hill and large hill events at the 1998 Winter Olympics.

References

1978 births
Living people
Ukrainian male ski jumpers
Olympic ski jumpers of Ukraine
Ski jumpers at the 1998 Winter Olympics
Sportspeople from Kyiv